Hauho is a former municipality of Finland. It was situated in the province of Southern Finland and is today a part of the region of Tavastia Proper (Kanta-Häme / Egentliga Tavastland).

Hauho was amalgamated with the municipality of Hämeenlinna on 1 January 2009.

It has been calculated that Hauho lies at Finland's "population-centre" (Weber point), that is to say: the point in Finland closest on average to the place of residence of every inhabitant of the country.

Lakes Iso-Roine, Hauhonselkä, and Ilmoilanselkä are located in Hauho.

References

External links 

Former municipalities of Finland
Hämeenlinna
Populated places established in 1868
Populated places disestablished in 2009
1868 establishments in Finland
2009 disestablishments in Finland